Hedeby (Old Norse Heiðabýr, German Haithabu) was an important Danish Viking Age (8th to the 11th centuries) trading settlement near the southern end of the Jutland Peninsula, now in the Schleswig-Flensburg district of Schleswig-Holstein, Germany. It is the most important archaeological site in Schleswig-Holstein. Around 965, chronicler Abraham ben Jacob visited Hedeby and described it as, "a very large city at the very end of the world's ocean."

The settlement developed as a trading centre at the head of a narrow, navigable inlet known as the Schlei, which connects to the Baltic Sea. The location was favorable because there is a short portage of less than 15 km to the Treene River, which flows into the Eider with its North Sea estuary, making it a convenient place where goods and ships could be pulled on a corduroy road overland for an almost uninterrupted seaway between the Baltic and the North Sea and avoid a dangerous and time-consuming circumnavigation of Jutland, providing Hedeby with a role similar to later Lübeck. Hedeby was the second largest Nordic town during the Viking Age, after Uppåkra in present-day southern Sweden, The city of Schleswig was later founded on the other side of the Schlei. Hedeby was abandoned after its destruction in 1066.

Hedeby was rediscovered in the late 19th century and excavations began in 1900. The Hedeby Museum was opened next to the site in 1985. Because of its historical importance during the Viking Age and exceptional preservation, Hedeby and the nearby defensive earthworks of the Danevirke were inscribed on the UNESCO World Heritage List in 2018. 

Hedeby is mentioned in Hans Christian Andersen's fairy tale "The Marsh King's Daughter."

Name

The Old Norse name Heiða-býr simply translates to "heath-settlement" (heiðr "heath" and býr = "yard; settlement, village, town"). The name is recorded in numerous spelling variants.

 Heiðabýr is the reconstructed name in standard Old Norse, also anglicized as Heithabyr.
 The Stone of Eric,  a 10th-century Danish runestone with an inscription mentioning  ᚼᛅᛁᚦᛅ᛭ᛒᚢ (haiþa bu), found in 1796.
Old English æt Hæðum, from Ohtere's and Wulfstan's accounts of their travels to Alfred the Great in the Old English Orosius.
 Hedeby, the modern Danish spelling, also most commonly used in English.
 Haddeby is the Low German form, also the name of the administrative district  formed in 1949 and named for the site; in 1985, the district introduced a coat of arms featuring a bell with a runic inscription reading ᚼᛁᚦᛅ᛬ᛒᚢ (hiþa:bu).
 Haithabu is the modern German spelling used when referring to the historical settlement; this spelling represents the transliteration of the name as found in the Stone of Eric  inscription; it was introduced among other variants in antiquarian literature in the 19th century and has since become the standard German name of the settlement.

Sources from the 9th and 10th century AD also attest to the names Sliesthorp and Sliaswich (cf. -thorp vs. -wich), and the town of Schleswig still exists 3 km north of Hedeby. However, Æthelweard claimed in his Latin translation of the Anglo-Saxon Chronicle that the Saxons used Slesuuic and the Danes Haithaby to refer to the same town.

History

Origins
Hedeby is first mentioned in the Frankish chronicles of Einhard (804) who was in the service of Charlemagne,
but was probably founded around 770. In 808 the Danish king Godfred (Lat. Godofredus) destroyed a competing Slav trade centre named Reric, and it is recorded in the Frankish chronicles that he moved the merchants from there to Hedeby. This may have provided the initial impetus for the town to develop. The same sources record that Godfred strengthened the Danevirke, an earthen wall that stretched across the south of the Jutland peninsula. The Danevirke joined the defensive walls of Hedeby to form an east–west barrier across the peninsula, from the marshes in the west to the Schlei inlet leading into the Baltic in the east.

The town itself was surrounded on its three landward sides (north, west, and south) by earthworks. At the end of the 9th century the northern and southern parts of the town were abandoned for the central section. Later a 9-metre (29-ft) high semi-circular wall was erected to guard the western approaches to the town. On the eastern side, the town was bordered by the innermost part of the Schlei inlet and the bay of Haddebyer Noor.

Timeline

Rise
Hedeby became a principal marketplace because of its geographical location on the major trade routes between the Frankish Empire and Scandinavia (north-south), and between the Baltic and the North Sea (east-west). Between 800 and 1000 the growing economic power of the Vikings led to its dramatic expansion as a major trading centre. Along with Birka and Schleswig, Hedeby's prominence as a major international trading hub served as a foundation of the Hanseatic League that would emerge by the 12th century.

The following indicate the importance achieved by the town:
 The town was described by visitors from England (Wulfstan - 9th century) and the Mediterranean (Al-Tartushi - 10th century).
 Hedeby became the seat of a bishop (948) and belonged to the Archbishopric of Hamburg and Bremen.
 The town minted its own coins (from 825).
 Adam of Bremen (11th century) reports that ships were sent from this portus maritimus to Slavic lands, to Sweden, Samland (Semlant) and even Greece.

A Swedish dynasty founded by Olof the Brash is said to have ruled Hedeby during the last decades of the 9th century and the first part of the 10th century. This was told to Adam of Bremen by the Danish king Sweyn Estridsson, and it is supported by three runestones found in Denmark. Two of them were raised by the mother of Olof's grandson Sigtrygg Gnupasson. The third runestone, discovered in 1796, is from Hedeby, the Stone of Eric.  It is inscribed with Norwegian-Swedish runes. It is, however, possible that Danes also occasionally wrote with this version of the younger futhark.

Lifestyle
Life was short and crowded in Hedeby. The small houses were clustered tightly together in a grid, with the east–west streets leading down to jetties in the harbour. People rarely lived beyond 30 or 40, and archaeological research shows that their later years were often painful due to crippling diseases such as tuberculosis. 

Al-Tartushi, a late  10th-century traveller from al-Andalus, provides one of the most colourful and often quoted descriptions of life in Hedeby. Al-Tartushi was from Cordoba in Spain, which had a significantly more wealthy and comfortable lifestyle than Hedeby. While Hedeby may have been significant by Scandinavian standards, Al-Tartushi was unimpressed:
"Slesvig (Hedeby) is a very large town at the extreme end of the world ocean... The inhabitants worship Sirius, except for a minority of Christians who have a church of their own there.... He who slaughters a sacrificial animal puts up poles at the door to his courtyard and impales the animal on them, be it a piece of cattle, a ram, billy goat or a pig so that his neighbours will be aware that he is making a sacrifice in honour of his god. The town is poor in goods and riches. People eat mainly fish which exist in abundance. Babies are thrown into the sea for reasons of economy. The right to divorce belongs to the women.... Artificial eye make-up is another peculiarity; when they wear it their beauty never disappears, indeed it is enhanced in both men and women. Further: Never did I hear singing fouler than that of these people, it is a rumbling emanating from their throats, similar to that of a dog but even more bestial."

Destruction
The town was sacked in 1050 by King Harald Hardrada of Norway during a conflict with King Sweyn II of Denmark. He set the town on fire by sending several burning ships into the harbour, the charred remains of which were found at the bottom of the Schlei during recent excavations. A Norwegian skald, quoted by Snorri Sturluson, describes the sack as follows:
Burnt in anger from end to end was Hedeby[..]
High rose the flames from the houses when, before dawn, I stood upon the stronghold's arm

In 1066 the town was sacked and burned by West Slavs. Following the destruction, Hedeby was slowly abandoned. People moved across the Schlei inlet, which separates the two peninsulas of Angeln and Schwansen, and founded the town of Schleswig.

Archaeology

20th-century excavations

After the settlement was abandoned, rising waters contributed to the complete disappearance of all visible structures on the site. It was even forgotten where the settlement had been. This proved to be fortunate for later archaeological work at the site.

Archaeological work began at the site in 1900 after the rediscovery of the settlement. Excavations were conducted for the next 15 years. Further excavations were carried out between 1930 and 1939. Archaeological work on the site was productive for two main reasons: that the site had never been built on since its destruction some 840 years earlier, and that the permanently waterlogged ground had preserved wood and other perishable materials. After the Second World War, in 1959, archaeological work was started again and has continued intermittently ever since. The embankments surrounding the settlement were excavated, and the harbour was partially dredged, during which the wreck of a Viking ship was discovered. Despite all this work, only 5% of the settlement (and only 1% of the harbour) has as yet been investigated.

The most important finds resulting from the excavations are now on display in the adjoining Haithabu Museum.

21st-century reconstructions
In 2005 an ambitious archaeological reconstruction program was initiated on the original site. Based on the results of archaeological analyses, exact copies of some of the original Viking houses have been rebuilt.

See also
 Hedeby Viking Museum
 Hedeby stones, Schlei
 People: Wulfstan of Hedeby, Al-Tartushi, Adam of Bremen, Harold Hardrada, Rurik, Godfred (Danish King), Olof the Brash
 Towns: Jelling, Birka, Ribe, Schleswig, Reric
 Viking Age

Notes

Bibliography and media
 A number of short archaeological films relating to Hedeby and produced by researchers during the 1980s are available on DVD from the University of Kiel's Archaeological Film Project.
 Most publications on Hedeby are in German. See Wikipedia's German-language article on Hedeby.

External links

 Website of the Haithabu Viking Museum
 Pictures from the Haithabu Viking Museum
 Flickr Photo Gallery: Viking houses and museum

Archaeological sites in Germany
Former populated places in Denmark
Former populated places in Germany
History of Schleswig-Holstein
Viking Age populated places
World Heritage Sites in Germany